The First All-Belarusian Congress was a congress of Belarusian political organisations and groups held in Minsk in December 1917. The congress gathered 1872 delegates from all regions of Belarus and was violently dispersed by the Bolshevik military.

The congress played an important role in the consolidation of the Belarusian national liberation movement after the October Revolution in Russia. The council that was selected at the congress formed the Rada of the Belarusian Democratic Republic and on 25 March 1918 declared the independence of Belarus as the Belarusian Democratic Republic.

Background

In early 1917 Belarus was still part of the Russian Empire. Following the February and October Revolutions in Russia, the Bolsheviks who came to power promised free self-determination to all nations living in the former Russian Empire, including the possibility of gaining full independence. Belarusian political organizations, representing regions with a Belarusian majority population, decided to hold a conference in order to work out a unitary position regarding the future of Belarus. The Supreme Belarusian Council, a coalition consolidating Belarusian organizations, was the organizer of the conference.

The congress
A total of 1872 delegates came to the conference, representing all regions of Belarus. The delegates were representatives of various social and political organizations, local governments, trade unions, as well as of refugees to Russia, soldiers of the Russian army and diasporas in Petrograd and Moscow.

The congress elected the Council of the First All-Belarusian Congress of 71 members under the leadership of Jan Sierada. The Council, in turn, formed an executive committee which was to serve as the organizing body in the process of establishing a modern constitutional democratic Belarusian state.

There were active discussions on various topics of the future of Belarus, with the main question being the future form of state of Belarus. Right wing-leaning delegates and many delegates from western Belarus insisted on immediately declaring full independence of Belarus from Russia. Left-leaning delegates and delegates from the eastern regions of Belarus opposed this idea. Many of them proposed that Belarus establish itself as an entity within a democratic Russian Federation.

In the night of 18 December 1917, the delegates adopted the first items of the final resolution, declaring Belarus a democratic republic but without yet defining its status in relation with Russia. At this point Bolshevik soldiers violently interrupted the conference and arrested several participants.

Aftermath
The executive committee of the congress' council managed to maintain its activity in the underground up until Minsk was taken over by German forces in February 1918. It later transformed into the Rada of the Belarusian Democratic Republic (Rada BNR) and declared the independence of Belarus in March 1918. The Rada BNR later held negotiations with various foreign governments regarding international recognition of the independence of Belarus and still exists in exile today.

According to Belarusian authors, the congress has managed to bring the question of Belarus on the international agenda. In particular, the Soviets were criticized for dispersing the conference at the Soviet-German Brest-Litovsk peace conference and in a few articles in German, Swiss and Russian non-Bolshevik media.

According to a widespread view in Belarus, the conference had a pivotal meaning for the Belarusian independence movement, the future establishment of the Belarusian Democratic Republic and later the Belarusian Soviet Republic.

In February 1919, the Bolsheviks held their own conference with an almost identical name, the First All-Belarusian Congress of the Soviets of Worker, Peasant and Red army Soldier Deputies, at the same venue as the First All-Belarusian Congress. The Soviet Congress adopted the constitution of the Soviet Socialist Republic of Belarus.

See also
 Belarusian Democratic Republic
 Western Oblast (1917–18)
 Vilnius Conference

References

Belarusian National Republic
Belarusian opposition
Belarusian independence movement
Legal history of Belarus
1917 in Belarus
1917 conferences